The following is the discography of Thousand Foot Krutch, a Canadian rock band. The band has released eight studio albums to date, four of which were released through Tooth & Nail Records, with whom the band was signed to from 2002 to 2011. When originally formed, the band created a mix of nu metal and rapcore, but in recent years has begun to create a mix of hard rock and alternative rock.

Studio albums

Remix albums
[[The End Is Where We Begin (album)#TFK Remixes EP|TFK Remixes EP]]
 Release date: October 1, 2012
 Label: Independent

Metamorphosiz: The End Remixes Vol. 1
 Release date: December 4, 2012
 Label: Independent

Metamorphosiz: The End Remixes Vol. 2
 Release date: July 2, 2013
 Label: Independent

Metamorphosiz : The End Remixes Vol. 1 & 2
Release date: November 19, 2013
Label: TFK

Winter Jam EP
Release date: January 8, 2017
Label: Independent

Live albums

Compilation albums

Singles

Music videos

Songs on compilations

Other certified songs

References

Rock music group discographies
Discographies of Canadian artists
Christian music discographies